Quercus ithaburensis, the Mount Tabor oak, is a tree in the beech family Fagaceae. It is found from southeastern Italy to the Palestine region. It is the national tree of Jordan. Two subspecies are accepted, Quercus ithaburensis subsp. ithaburensis and Quercus ithaburensis subsp. macrolepis (syn. Quercus macrolepis, the Valonia oak). Together with Quercus brantii, it forms a clade of distinct, closely related species within the oak section Cerris.

Description
They are dark glossy green above and gray tomentose below.

Flowering occurs from March through April in most of its native range. The acorns are generally oval, up to 5 cm long and 3 cm wide with a cap covering roughly one-third of the acorn, maturing in 18 months, dropping from the tree in the second autumn after pollination. The cap is covered in long stiff loose scales which are rolled backwards or involute, especially along the edges of the cap.

Taxonomy
Two subspecies are accepted:
Quercus ithaburensis subsp. ithaburensis – Turkey to the Palestine region
Quercus ithaburensis subsp. macrolepis (Kotschy) Hedge & Yalt., syn. Quercus macrolepis, the Valonia oak – throughout the range of the species except the Palestine region

Distribution and habitat
Quercus ithaburensis is native from southeastern Italy, through Albania, former Yugoslavia, Bulgaria, Greece, Crete, the East Aegean Islands, Turkey, Lebanon-Syria, south to the Palestine region.

Before the 20th century, the Plain of Sharon was covered by open woodland dominated by Quercus ithaburensis, which extended from Kfar Yona in the north to Ra’ananna in the south. The local Arab inhabitants traditionally used the area for pasture, firewood and intermittent cultivation. The intensification of settlement and agriculture in the coastal plain during the 19th century led to deforestation and subsequent environmental degradation known from Hebrew sources.

Uses
The cups of Quercus ithaburensis subsp. macrolepis, known as valonia, are used for tanning and dyeing as are the unripe acorns called camata or camatina. The ripe acorns are eaten raw or boiled.

See also
 Valoneic acid

References

External links
 Line drawing from Flora Palaestina 

Flora of Albania
Flora of Bulgaria
Flora of the East Aegean Islands
Flora of Greece
Flora of Italy
Flora of Crete
Flora of Lebanon and Syria
Flora of Palestine (region)
Flora of Turkey
Flora of European Turkey
Flora of Yugoslavia
ithaburensis
Plants described in 1835
Taxa named by Joseph Decaisne